The multiverse is the hypothetical set of multiple possible universes that comprise all of reality.

Multiverse may also refer to:

Concept

In fiction
 Multiverse (DC Comics), the fictional multiverse used by DC Comics
 Multiverse (Marvel Comics), the fictional multiverse used by Marvel Comics
 Multiverse (Marvel Cinematic Universe), the multiverse as depicted in the Marvel Cinematic Universe
 Multiverse (Magic: The Gathering), the fictional universe of Magic: The Gathering
 Multiverse (Michael Moorcock), the multiverse of Michael Moorcock
 Michael Moorcock's Multiverse, a comic book series by Michael Moorcock
 Multiverse (Stephen King), the multiverse of Stephen King
 The Multiverse, the central concept of the Dungeons and Dragons Planescape setting
 Multiverse series, a series of three novels by David Weber and Linda Evans, and Joelle Presby
 MultiVersus, a crossover fighting game with characters from multiple Warner Bros. Discovery properties

Computing
 Multiverse Network, an American software company
 Multiverse Foundation, a non-profit foundation continuing the work of the Multiverse Network
 Multiverse, a package classification for Ubuntu
 Multiverse (video games), a collection of interconnected virtual worlds that allows users to travel within and between these worlds

Music
 Multiverse, an alternative rock/metal band from Russia
 Multiverse, a track by Electric Universe from Silence in Action
 Multiverse Music, a British music publisher

Albums
 Multiverse, a 2012 progressive house album by Jaytech
 Multiverse, a 2022 hip hop album by Wiz Khalifa

Other uses 
 Multiverse (set theory), view that there are many equally valid models of set theory
 Multiverse (professional wrestling), professional wrestling event promoted by Impact Wrestling

See also
 Parallel universe (disambiguation)
 Omniverse (disambiguation)
 Megaverse (disambiguation)
 Universe (disambiguation)